Marcia C. Linn (née Cyrog) is a professor of development and cognition specializing in education in mathematics, science, and technology in the Graduate School of Education at the University of California, Berkeley. Since 1970 she has made contributions to the understanding of how computers and technology can be used to support learning and teaching in mathematics and science.

Family
Linn was born in Milwaukee, Wisconsin to Frances and George Cyrog. Frances became the principal of Sorenson School in Whittier, California. George was a supervisor in the postal service as well as a rockhound who founded the Whittier Gem and Mineral Society. Marcia's lifelong interest in science learning stems from growing up as the oldest child in a family enthusiastic about learning. Her father, George, believed everyone could learn about all aspects of science and engineering and implemented this in his hobby of collecting rocks and minerals. Her mother, Frances, developed a philosophy for individualized reading instruction starting when she taught elementary school and continuing as she became an elementary school principal.

Education
Linn received a B.A. in psychology and statistics (1965), an M. A. in educational psychology (1967), and a Ph.D. in Educational Psychology (1970) from Stanford University working under the mentorship of Lee Cronbach. Her research addresses how technology-enhanced curricula, visualizations, and assessments can deepen student understanding of science.

In 1967-68, Linn worked with Jean Piaget and other researchers at the Institute Jean Jacques Rousseau in Geneva, Switzerland. In Geneva, listening to researchers probe students' ideas motivated her to listen closely to the ideas that students bring to a learning situation. Linn spent time in schools interviewing students and learning to conduct interviews using the Piagetian clinical method. In Geneva, and when she returned to California, Linn conducted many interviews in which she asked students to explore scientific problems. She learned that student ideas about scientific topics are diverse and often well connected. These interviews formed the basis for her perspective on knowledge integration.

Academic career
Linn was a Research Psychologist at the Lawrence Hall of Science (1970–1987) and led the ACCEL program, a National Science Foundation-funded research project that investigated the cognitive consequences of computer environments for learning. She won an Apple Wheels for the Mind grant in 1985 for The Computer as Lab Partner, a project to bring Apple computers equipped with sensing probes into schools. With Robert Tinker, she developed the first Microcomputer-based Labs and probeware for middle school science.

In 1983 she was Fulbright Professor at the Weizmann Institute of Science in Rehovot, Israel. In 1983 she won one of two grants awarded by the National Institute of Education to study the emerging role of technology in education. This project, Assessing the Cognitive Consequences of Computer Environments for Learning, documented the early uses of personal computers in classrooms. In 1986 she received a three-year grant from the National Science Foundation to study Autonomous Learning Materials for Pascal Courses and studied programming instruction as an approach to learning complex problem-solving skills.

Common themes emerging in her research studying how students learn computer science and middle school science led her to describe the knowledge integration framework (see summary in Linn, 1995 NSF publication).

From 1989 to 1996 Marcia was director of the Instructional Technology Program at the UC Berkeley. She was responsible for introducing and encouraging innovative university teaching using multimedia and education technologies.

In 1995–1996, 2001–2002, and 2010-2011, Linn was a fellow at the Center for Advanced Study in Behavioral Sciences in Stanford, California. In 2008-2009 she was President of the International Society for the Learning Sciences .

Linn is a member of the National Academy of Education and a Fellow of the American Association for the Advancement of Science, the American Psychological Association, and the Association for Psychological Science. She has served as Chair of the AAAS Education Section and as President of the International Society of the Learning Sciences.

Her board services include the American Association for the Advancement of Science board, the Graduate Record Examination Board of the Educational Testing Service, the James S. McDonnell Foundation Cognitive Studies in Education Practice board, and the Directorate for Education and Human Resources at the National Science Foundation.

Linn's books include Computers, Teachers, Peers (2000), Internet Environments for Science Education (2004), Designing Coherent Science Education (2008), WISE Science (2009), and Science Learning and Instruction: Taking Advantage of Technology to Promote Knowledge Integration (2011).
Awards include the National Association for Research in Science Teaching Award for Lifelong Distinguished Contributions to Science Education and the Council of Scientific Society Presidents first Educational Research Award.

She currently directs the NSF-funded Technology-Enhanced Learning in Science (TELS) center and the Web-based Inquiry Science Environment (WISE).

References

External links 
 Marcia C. Linn's webpage and CV/publications
 Technology Enhanced Learning in Science (TELS)
 Web-based Integrated Science Environment (WISE)
 Graduate School of Education: Marcia Linn

Year of birth missing (living people)
Living people
Scientists from Milwaukee
American cognitive scientists
Stanford University alumni
University of California, Berkeley Graduate School of Education faculty